Michael Berne is an Australian rugby player who played as centre for Leinster Rugby in 2007–2008.

Berne began playing junior footy for Coogee Randwick Wombats in the South Sydney Juniors competition. In 2002, he was with the South Sydney Rabbitohs and was the leading First Division try scorer. In 2003, he played for Salford City Reds, England for a season.

References

External links
 Profile in Leinster

1981 births
Living people
Australian rugby league players
Australian rugby union players
Leinster Rugby players
Rugby league players from Sydney
Salford Red Devils players
South Sydney Rabbitohs players
21st-century Australian people